Chase Manhattan Bank NA v Israel-British Bank (London) Ltd [1981] Ch 105 is an English trusts law case, concerning constructive trusts. It held that a trust arose to protect a payment made under a mistake, with the benefit of a proprietary remedy. This is seen important for the question of what response, personal or proprietary, may come from a claim in unjust enrichment.

As a matter of the conflict of laws, the court held that New York law was the proper law to determine if the payor retained an equitable interest in the sums paid by mistake, and that this was a substantive rule rather than a procedural one.

The decision in the case has been subjected to "sustained, authoritative criticism", both academically and judicially.

Facts
Chase Manhattan was instructed to pay $2m to the Israel-British Bank, but it paid the sum twice by mistake. The Israel-British Bank subsequently became insolvent and entered into liquidation after Yehoshua Ben-Zion, the managing director, was convicted of embezzling £20 million ($39.4 million) from the bank. Chase Manhattan wished to claim back the money which it had mistakenly paid. However, because the Israel-British Bank was now insolvent, rather than make a claim for a dividend in the liquidation, where it would have to compete with all of the other creditors of the insolvent bank, Chase Manhattan sought to argue that the entire sums were held on trust and so should be returned as part of a proprietary claim to the money.

The Israel-British bank had known about the mistake on the part of Chase Manhattan before it went into liquidation.

Judgment
Goulding J held that Chase Manhattan could recover the full sum, because the money was held on trust from the moment it was received. He said the following.

Criticism
The decision has been subject to "sustained, authoritative criticism."

The case was reviewed in Westdeutsche Landesbank Girozentrale v Islington LBC by Lord Browne-Wilkinson, and expressed doubts as to the reasoning.  He stated "I cannot agree with this reasoning.  First, it is based on a concept of retaining an equitable property in money where, prior to payment to the recipient bank, there was no existing equitable interest.  Further, I cannot understand how the recipient's conscience can be affected at a time when he is not aware of any mistake."  This view, expressed by way of obiter dictum, was particularly criticised by Peter Birks on the ground that the more straightforward way to establish a claim would be for unjust enrichment, should trigger a proprietary remedy in a similar circumstance, regardless of the position of one's notional conscience.

Lord Millett, writing extrajudicially, has also criticised the decision, stating "It is easy to agree with Lord Browne-Wilkinson that [Chase Manhattan v Israel-British Bank] was wrongy decided, but it was wrongly decided not because [the transferee] had no notice of the [transferor's] claim ... but because the [claimant] had no proprietary interest for it to have notice of."

Most of this criticism relates to the views expressed that, if the proper law to determine the issues had been English law, that the proprietary claim was valid.  But the case was contested on the basis that both parties to the proceedings accepted that the proper law to determine this issue was New York law.

See also
 English land law
 English property law
 English trusts law

References 

1981 in British law
1981 in case law
Court of Appeal (England and Wales) cases
English banking case law
English trusts case law
English unjust enrichment case law
JPMorgan Chase